was an admiral and commander in the Imperial Japanese Navy (IJN) during World War II. Early in the war with the United States, Arima commanded the battleship , one of the largest battleships ever built.

Biography
Arima was a native of Miyazaki prefecture. He graduated from the 42nd class of the Imperial Japanese Naval Academy in 1914. He was ranked 40th in a class of 117 cadets. As a midshipman, he was assigned to the cruiser  and battleship , and as a sub-lieutenant to the cruiser .

Arima graduated from the 25th class of the Naval Staff College and was promoted to lieutenant commander in December 1926. After a 2½-year stint as a gunnery instructor at the Imperial Japanese Naval Academy, he subsequently served as chief gunnery officer on the cruiser . He was assigned to the staff of the 2nd Expeditionary Fleet in China in September 1931, and made the jump to the Imperial Japanese Navy General Staff in November 1932. After his promotion to commander in December 1932, he served as an instructor at the Naval Staff College through 1937.

Arima was also promoted to captain in December 1936, and received his first command, the cruiser  in November 1939. In October 1940, he was assigned command of the battleship . From September 1941, he was executive officer on the new super-battleship , and became its captain on 5 August 1942. He was promoted to rear admiral on 1 November. For most of the remainder of the war, he served as an instructor at the naval academy and specialized training schools.

Later, Arima served as chief of staff for the IJN's IJN 4th Fleet; he was promoted to vice admiral on 1 November 1945. Surviving the war, Arima died in 1956.

References

Notes

Books

Rekishi Dokuhon, Document of the war No. 48 Overview of Imperial Japanese Navy Admirals, Shin-Jinbutsuoraisha Co., Ltd., Tōkyō, Japan, 1999, .

Web

1893 births
1956 deaths
People from Miyazaki Prefecture
Japanese admirals of World War II
Imperial Japanese Navy admirals